Yanaorcco (possibly from Quechua yana black, urqu mountain, "black mountain") is a mountain in the Urubamba mountain range in the Andes of  Peru, about  high. It lies in the Cusco Region, Calca Province, Lares District. Yanaorcco is situated northwest of Ccerayoc and northeast of Sahuasiray.

References 

Mountains of Peru
Mountains of Cusco Region